Ismakayevo (İsmaqay) is a rural locality (a selo) in Verkhneavzyansky Selsoviet, Beloretsky District, Bashkortostan, Russia. The population was 273 as of 2010. There are 8 streets.

Geography 
Ismakayevo is located 84 km southwest of Beloretsk (the district's administrative centre) by road. Bzyak is the nearest rural locality.

References 

Rural localities in Beloretsky District